Pedro Lazaga Sabater (3 October 1918 – 30 November 1979) was a Spanish film director and screenwriter. He directed more than 90 films between 1948 and 1979.

Selected filmography
 The Black Siren (1947)
 María Morena (1951)
 Fog and Sun (1951)
 Three Ladies (1960)
 Gladiators 7 (1962)
 Sor Citroën (1967)
 Cabaret Woman (1974)
 Naked Therapy (1975)
 Ambitious (1976)

External links

1918 births
1979 deaths
Spanish film directors
Spanish male screenwriters
20th-century Spanish screenwriters
20th-century Spanish male writers